Safaa Ali Nema (born 1959) is an Iraqi wrestler. He competed in the men's freestyle 90 kg at the 1980 Summer Olympics.

References

1959 births
Living people
Iraqi male sport wrestlers
Olympic wrestlers of Iraq
Wrestlers at the 1980 Summer Olympics
Place of birth missing (living people)